The 2012–13 Sunfoil Series was a first-class cricket competition held in South Africa from 20 September 2012 to 10 February 2013. Cape Cobras won their third title, during a 10 wicket victory in the final round against Knights.

Points table

References

External links
 Series home at ESPN Cricinfo

South African domestic cricket competitions
Sunfoil Series
2012–13 South African cricket season
Sunfoil Series